Pierre Dufau (21 June 1908 – 26 September 1985) was a French architect.

He is particularly known for his work on the reconstruction of Amiens after World War II, including the railway station, and the Tour Europlaza in Paris.

1908 births
1985 deaths
People from Arras
École des Beaux-Arts alumni
20th-century French architects
Officiers of the Légion d'honneur
Prix de Rome for architecture